The Nevada State Library, Archives and Public Records (NSLAPR) is the official State Library and State Archives for Nevada located in Carson City, Nevada. It is also combined with the Records Services department which manages public records in the State of Nevada for state agencies and local governments. The library manages many programs for public libraries including public library certification and standards, LSTA grants, bookmobile funding and training for library trustees. They oversee Nevada Talking Book Services for print-disabled users, Nevada Center for the Book, and the Nevada State Data Center to help localities work with census data.

History
Initially, the state library was a collection of reference works for the use of state government officers, with the Secretary of State designated the ex officio state librarian. The responsibility of this position went back and forth between the Secretary of State and the Lieutenant Governor, until 1915, when the State Library Commission was created and the state librarian became an administrator supervised by them.

References

External links

1863 establishments in Nevada
Buildings and structures in Carson City, Nevada
Government agencies established in 1863
Public libraries in Nevada
State agencies of Nevada
State libraries of the United States
Libraries established in 1863